Bethania Rehabilitation Centre is a centre for the rehabilitation of the physically disabled women at Kumarapuram, Trivandrum, Kerala, India. The centre was started on 1 June 1988. The centre is managed by the Bethany Sisters (Bethany Madhom) of the Syro-Malankara Catholic Church. It is also aided by the Government of India. The objectives of the centre are to: 
 Promote community-based rehabilitation
 Impart vocational training
 Provide residential facilities during training
 Train in self-employment
 Provide corrective physiotherapy.
At present nearly 50 physically disabled girls and women of 15–30 age group are getting training in cutting and tailoring, typewriting and shorthand, bookbinding, candle making, poultry farming, beekeeping, rabbit rearing, handicrafts, horticulture and home management.

Source

Brochure of Bethania

References

Syro-Malankara Catholic Church
Charities based in India